2017–18 SuperLega is the 73rd season of the Italian Championship (highest level of Italian Volleyball League) organized under the supervision of Federazione Italiana Pallavolo. This season is composed of 14 teams.

The Super Cup preceded the regular season on October 7–8, 2017. Sir Safety Conad Perugia won the Super Cup.

Team

Super Cup (Pre-season)
Four teams participated in Italian Super Cup. Perugia won the tournament defeating Civitanova in the final match.
Azimut Modena
Cucine Lube Civitanova
Diatec Trentino
Sir Safety Conad Perugia

Regular season

League table

|}

Results table

1st Round 1st Half

|}

2nd Round 1st Half

|}

3rd Round 1st Half

|}

4th Round 1st Half

|}

5th Round 1st Half

|}

6th Round 1st Half

|}

7th Round 1st Half

|}

8th Round 1st Half

|}

9th Round 1st Half

|}

10th Round 1st Half

|}

11th Round 1st Half

|}

12th Round 1st Half

|}

13th Round 1st Half

|}

2nd Round 1st Half

|}

2nd Round 2nd Half

|}

3rd Round 2nd Half

|}

4th Round 2nd Half

|}

5th Round 2nd Half

|}

6th Round 2nd Half

|}

7th Round 2nd Half

|}

8th Round 2nd Half

|}

9th Round 2nd Half

|}

10th Round 2nd Half

|}

11th Round 2nd Half

|}

12th Round 2nd Half

|}

13th Round 2nd Half

|}

Play-offs

Quarter-finals
Best-of-three series

|}

|}

|}

|}

Semi-finals
Best-of-five series

|}

|}

Finals
Best-of-five series

|}

Final standing

References

External links
Official website

Men's volleyball competitions in Italy
Italy
2017 in Italian sport
2018 in Italian sport